Go Soeda was the defending champion but lost to his compatriot Yuichi Sugita in the first round. Danai Udomchoke became the new champion after his win against Blaž Kavčič in the final (6–2, 6–2).

Seeds

Draw

Final four

Top half

Bottom half

References
 Main Draw
 Qualifying Draw

Busan Open Challenger Tennis - Singles
2009 Singles